Euchlora hirsuta is a species of flowering plant in the family Fabaceae and the tribe Crotalarieae found in South Africa. It is the only species included in the genus Euchlora.

References

Crotalarieae
Monotypic Fabaceae genera